Womersley is a village in the Selby District, in the English county of North Yorkshire. The parish population at the 2011 census (including Stapleton and Walden Stubbs) was 515. It is near the towns of Selby, Askern and Pontefract. It is close to the borders with South and West Yorkshire.

The village was historically part of the West Riding of Yorkshire until 1974.

Amenities 
Womersley has a place of worship, St Martin's Church, which is a Grade I listed building.

Location grid

References 

Philip's North Yorkshire Street Atlas

Selby District
Villages in North Yorkshire